The Budden Canyon Formation is the name of a sedimentary rock formation in California of Cretaceous (Berriasian-Turonian) age. 

The formation consists of more than 20,000 feet of clastic sediments of non-marine (alluvial fan), shallow marine, slope and basin floor fan turbidites.

Fossil content 
The formation is very fossiliferous with common macro-fossils, such as ammonites, gastropods, and bivalves found both in concretions and bedding planes, along with common petrified wood, woody material, and leaf and seed fossils. In addition to these are marine microfossils, including foraminifera and microgastropods. There are also rare vertebrate remains, including fish, pterosaurs, a dinosaur and marine turtles.

See also 
 List of dinosaur-bearing rock formations
 List of stratigraphic units with indeterminate dinosaur fossils

References

Bibliography

Further reading 

 
 
 
 
 R. A. Stockey and S. Y. Smith. 2000. A new species of Millerocaulis (Osmundaceae) from the Lower Cretaceous of California. International Journal of Plant Sciences 161(1):159-166
 R. P. Hilton, E. S. Göhre, P. G. Embree and T. A. Stidham. 1999. California's first fossil evidence of Cretaceous winged vertebrates. California Geology 52(4):4-10
 L. R. Saul and R. L. Squires. 1998. New Cretaceous Gastropoda from California. Palaeontology 41(3):461-488
 R. L. Squires and L. R. Saul. 1997. Review of bivalve genus Plicatula from Cretaceous and Lower Cenozoic strata of California and Baja California. 71(2):287-298
 R. P. Hilton, F. L. DeCourten, and P. G. Embree. 1995. First California dinosaur north of Sacramento. California Geology 48(4):99-102
 D. J. Long, M. A. Murphy, and P. U. Rodda. 1993. A New World occurrence of Notidanodon lanceolatus (Chondrichthyes, Hexanchidae) and comments on hexanchid shark evolution. Journal of Paleontology 67(4):655-659
 P. U. Rodda, M. A. Murphy, and C. Schuchman. 1993. The nautilid Eucymatoceras (Mollusca: Cephalopoda) in the Lower Cretaceous of northern California. The Veliger 36:265-269
 L. T. Groves. 1990. New Species of Late Cretaceous Cypraeacea (Mollusca: Gastropoda) from California and Mississippi, and a Review of Cretaceous Cypraeaceans of North America. The Veliger 33(3):272-285
 E. Pessagno. 1977. Lower Cretaceous radiolarian biostratigraphy of the Great Valley sequence and Franciscan complex, California coast ranges. Cushman Foundation for foraminiferal research, Special Publication (15)1-87
 M. A. Murphy and P. U. Rodda. 1960. Mollusca of the Cretaceous Bald Hills Formation of California. Journal of Paleontology 34(5):835-858

Geologic formations of California
Lower Cretaceous Series of North America
Upper Cretaceous Series of North America
Cretaceous California
Berriasian Stage
Valanginian Stage
Hauterivian Stage
Barremian Stage
Aptian Stage
Albian Stage
Cenomanian Stage
Turonian Stage
Mudstone formations
Sandstone formations of the United States
Alluvial deposits
Deltaic deposits
Shallow marine deposits
Turbidite deposits
Paleontology in California